Săseni is a commune in Călărași District, Moldova. It is composed of two villages, Bahu and Săseni.

References

Communes of Călărași District